Nation's Giant Hamburgers, or simply Nation's, is a privately held El Cerrito, California-based fast food diner chain.

The chain, founded in 1952, largely operates in the San Francisco Bay Area. The majority (87.5%) of locations are focused in the suburban Greater East Bay; consisting of Alameda, Contra Costa, and Solano counties.

History

Harvey's Giant Hamburgers
Russ Harvey bought a six-stool hot dog stand on San Pablo Ave, where it meets with the end of San Pablo Dam Rd. in 1952 with money he obtained through the sale of his 1948 Buick. He subsequently added hamburgers to the menu of the hot dog restaurant with a focus on large portions. This gastronomic decision proved successful with the clientele. The restaurant's name was changed to Harvey's Giant Hamburgers.

Dale Power
In 1961 local teenager Dale Power was hired as a janitor and continued his employment from high school to bachelor's and master's degrees at the nearby University of California, Berkeley. In 1970 he purchased his first restaurant in the Jack London Square District in neighboring Oakland.

Partnership and expansion
He christened it Nation's; the name was decided upon under the belief that they sold the best hamburgers in the nation. At this point Russ Harvey changed the name of his restaurant to Nation's as the two men became partners under a unified brand.

More items were added to the menu over time including breakfast, lunch, and dinner items and award-winning pies.

Currently Power remains with the company as CEO and president, while Harvey has retired. The company has expanded to 24 locations as of 2009 with eateries in six counties.

Locations
The chain has eight locations in Alameda County, in Alameda, Berkeley, Fremont, Hayward, Livermore, Oakland, Pleasanton and San Leandro. There are four in Solano County, located in Benicia, Fairfield, Vacaville and Vallejo.

Furthermore, there are ten locations in Contra Costa County including: Concord, El Cerrito, Moraga, Orinda, Pittsburg, Pleasant Hill, San Ramon, San Pablo, Tara Hills (an unincorporated area), and Brentwood, which opened in October 2010. The Castro Valley location was opened in April 2014.  The original San Pablo location is no longer standing, and the current San Pablo Nation's is located at San Pablo Avenue and San Pablo Dam Road. on the same site as the original restaurant.

There are single store locations in three other Bay Area counties: Daly City in San Mateo County, which is the only Nation's in the San Francisco Peninsula, Napa in the county by the same name, and two restaurants in the Central Valley cities of Stockton and Tracy in San Joaquin County.

Expansion brought the chain out of the Bay Area and into the Sacramento Valley. In May 2012, a restaurant located on Sunrise Blvd, Citrus Heights was opened, followed by another in Folsom, which opened in May 2013.

See also
 List of hamburger restaurants

References

External links
Official website

San Pablo, California
Fast-food hamburger restaurants
Restaurants established in 1952
Fast-food chains of the United States
Regional restaurant chains in the United States
Companies based in Contra Costa County, California
Restaurants in the San Francisco Bay Area
El Cerrito, California
1952 establishments in California